The Lumière brothers, Auguste Marie Louis Nicolas Lumière (19 October 1862 – 10 April 1954) and Louis Jean Lumière (5 October 1864 – 6 June 1948), were French manufacturers of photography equipment, best known for their Cinématographe motion picture system and the short films they produced between 1895 and 1905, which places them among the earliest filmmakers.

Their screening of a single film on 22 March 1895 for around 200 members of the "Society for the Development of the National Industry" in Paris was probably the first presentation of projected film. Their first commercial public screening on 28 December 1895 for around 40 paying visitors and invited relations has traditionally been regarded as the birth of cinema. Either the techniques or the business models of earlier filmmakers proved to be less viable than the breakthrough presentations of the Lumières.

History
The Lumière brothers were born in Besançon, France, to Charles-Antoine Lumière (1840–1911) and Jeanne Joséphine Costille Lumière, who were married in 1861 and moved to Besançon, setting up a small photographic portrait studio where Auguste and Louis were born. They moved to Lyon in 1870, where son Edouard and three daughters were born. Auguste and Louis both attended La Martiniere, the largest technical school in Lyon.

They patented several significant processes leading up to their film camera, most notably film perforations (originally implemented by Emile Reynaud) as a means of advancing the film through the camera and projector. The original cinématographe had been patented by Léon Guillaume Bouly on 12 February 1892. The cinématographe — a three-in-one device that could record, develop, and project motion pictures — was further developed by the Lumières. The brothers patented their own version on 13 February 1895. 

The date of the recording of their first film is in dispute. In an interview with Georges Sadoul given in 1948, Louis Lumière claimed that he shot the film in August 1894 - before the arrival of the kinetoscope in France. This is questioned by historians, who consider that a functional Lumière camera did not exist before the beginning of 1895. 

The Lumière brothers saw film as a novelty and had withdrawn from the film business by 1905. They went on to develop the first practical photographic colour process, the Lumière Autochrome.

Louis died on 6 June 1948 and Auguste on 10 April 1954. They are buried in a family tomb in the New Guillotière Cemetery in Lyon.

First film screenings
On 22 March 1895 in Paris, at the "Society for the Development of the National Industry", in front of a small audience, one of whom was said to be Léon Gaumont, then director of the company the Comptoir Géneral de la Photographie, the Lumières privately screened a single film, La Sortie de l'usine Lumière à Lyon. The main focus of the conference by Louis Lumière concerned the recent developments in the photographic industry, mainly the research on polychromy (colour photography). It was much to Lumière's surprise that the moving black-and-white images retained more attention than the coloured stills.

The Lumières gave their first paid public screening on 28 December 1895, at Salon Indien du Grand Café in Paris. This presentation consisted of the following 10 short films, lasting 50 seconds each, (in order of presentation):

La Sortie de l'usine Lumière à Lyon (literally, "the exit from the Lumière factory in Lyon", or, under its more common English title, Workers Leaving the Lumiere Factory), 46 seconds
Le Jardinier (l'Arroseur Arrosé) ("The Gardener", or "The Sprinkler Sprinkled"), 49 seconds
Le Débarquement du congrès de photographie à Lyon ("the disembarkment of the Congress of Photographers in Lyon"), 48 seconds
La Voltige ("Horse Trick Riders"), 46 seconds
La Pêche aux poissons rouges ("fishing for goldfish"), 42 seconds
Les Forgerons ("Blacksmiths"), 49 seconds
Repas de bébé ("Baby's Breakfast" (lit. "baby's meal")), 41 seconds
Le Saut à la couverture ("Jumping Onto the Blanket"), 41 seconds
La Place des Cordeliers à Lyon ("Cordeliers Square in Lyon"—a street scene), 44 seconds
La Mer (Baignade en mer) ("the sea [bathing in the sea]"), 38 seconds

Each film is 17 meters long, which, when hand cranked through a projector, runs approximately 50 seconds.

The Lumières went on tour with the cinématographe in 1896, visiting cities including Brussels, Bombay, London, Montreal, New York City, and Buenos Aires.

In 1896, only a few months after the initial screenings in Europe, films by the Lumiere Brothers were shown in Egypt, first in the Tousson stock exchange in Alexandria on 5 November 1896 and then in the Hamam Schneider (Schneider Bath) in Cairo.

Early colour photography

The brothers stated that "the cinema is an invention without any future" and declined to sell their camera to other filmmakers such as Georges Méliès. This made many film makers upset. Consequently, their role in the history of film was exceedingly brief. In parallel with their cinema work they experimented with colour photography. They worked on colour photographic processes in the 1890s including the Lippmann process (interference heliochromy) and their own 'bichromated glue' process, a subtractive colour process, examples of which were exhibited at the Exposition Universelle in Paris in 1900. This last process was commercialised by the Lumieres but commercial success had to wait for their next colour process. In 1903 they patented a colour photographic process, the Autochrome Lumière, which was launched on the market in 1907. Throughout much of the 20th century, the Lumière company was a major producer of photographic products in Europe, but the brand name, Lumière, disappeared from the marketplace following merger with Ilford.

Film systems that preceded the Cinématographe Lumière

 

Earlier moving images in for instance phantasmagoria shows, the phénakisticope, the zoetrope and Émile Reynaud's Théâtre Optique consisted of hand-drawn images. A system that could record reality in motion, in a fashion much like it is seen by the eyes, had a greater impact on people. 

Eadweard Muybridge's Zoopraxiscope projected moving painted silhouettes based on his chronophotography photography. The only Zoopraxiscope disc with actual photographs was made with an early form of stop motion. Less-known predecessors, such as Jules Duboscq's Bioscope were not projected.

William Friese-Greene patented a "machine camera" in 1889, which embodied many aspects of later film cameras. He displayed the results at photographic societies in 1890 and developed further cameras but did not publicly project the results. 

Ottomar Anschütz's Electrotachyscope projected very short loops of high photographic quality. 

Thomas Edison believed projection of films wasn't as viable a business model as offering the films in the "peepshow" kinetoscope device. Watching the images on the screen turned out to be much preferred by audiences. Thomas Edison's Kinetoscope (developed by William Kennedy Dickson), premiered publicly in 1894. 

Kazimierz Prószyński allegedly built his camera and projecting device, called Pleograph, in 1894. 

Lauste and Latham's Eidoloscope was demonstrated for members of the press on 21 April 1895, and opened to the paying public on Broadway on 20 May. They shot films up to twenty minutes long at speeds over thirty frames per second and showed them in many US cities. The Eidoloscope Company was dissolved in 1896 after various internal disputes.

Max and Emil Skladanowsky, inventors of the Bioscop, had offered projected moving images to a paying public in Berlin from 1 November 1895 until the end of the month. Their machinery was relatively cumbersome and their films much shorter. Their booking in Paris was cancelled after the news of the Lumière screening. Nonetheless, they toured their films to other countries.

See also 
Auguste Lumière
Louis Lumière
1895 in film
1896 in film
19th century in film
History of film
L'Idéal Cinéma Jacques Tati in Aniche the oldest still-active cinéma in the world, though not continuously, since 23 November 1905.
List of works by Louis Botinelly
Place Ambroise-Courtois

References

Notes

Works cited

General references
 Chardère, B. Les images des Lumière (in French). Paris: Gallimard, 1995. . 
 Cook, David. A History of Narrative Film (4th ed.). New York: W. W. Norton, 2004. .
 Mast, Gerald and Bruce F. Kawin. A Short History of the Movies (9th ed.). New York: Pearson Longman, 2006. .
 Rittaud-Hutinet, Jacques. Le cinéma des origines (in French). Seyssel, France: Champ Vallon, 1985. .

External links

 
 
 
 
 Le musée Lumière — Lumière Museum
 

 
1862 births
1864 births
1948 deaths
1954 deaths
Businesspeople from Lyon
Color scientists
Sibling filmmakers
Sibling duos
Filmmaking duos
French film directors
Silent film directors
Pioneers of photography
Cinema pioneers
History of film
Defunct film and television production companies
La Martinière Lyon alumni
Members of the French Academy of Sciences
Order of the Francisque recipients
Recipients of the Order of St. Sava
French cinema pioneers
Articles containing video clips